A forwarding agent was an intermediary who facilitated the routing of international mail before the development of the modern postal system.

History
In the early days of postal communications it was often necessary for international mail to pass through a number of hands before reaching its eventual destination. At each stage the agent would add their own mark. For instance, a letter might pass first through the sender's domestic post office's hands, then to a forwarder for a sea journey and then to the post office of the destination country.

The study of the marks of forwarding agents on mail is a popular branch of postal history.

See also
Thomas Fletcher Waghorn

Further reading 
Rowe, Kenneth. The postal history and markings of the forwarding agents. (1st edition 1966, supplement 1974, 2nd ed. 1984, 3rd ed. 1996. )

External links 
Images of Forwarding Agents marks used on Venezuela Stamps.
Images of Forwarding Agents marks used on British Malaya Stamps.
List of Hong Kong Forwarding Agents.
List of Forwarding Agents from Kenneth Rowe's book.

Philatelic terminology